A string trio is a group of three string instruments or a piece written for such a group. From at least the 19th century on, the term "string trio" with otherwise unspecified instrumentation normally refers to the combination violin, viola and cello. The classical string trio emerged during the mid-18th century and later expanded into four subgenres: the grand trio, the concertant trio, the brilliant trio, and the Hausmusik trio.

Early History
The earliest string trio, found during the mid 18th century, consisted of two violins and a cello, a grouping which had grown out of the Baroque trio sonata. Over the course of the late 18th century, the string trio scored for violin, viola, and cello came to be the predominant type. String trios scored for two violins and viola were also used, although much less frequently. The term "string trio" was not used until the late 19th century. The genre was previously referred to as divertimento a tre, sonate a tre, and terzetto. French composers sometimes used Trietti or Conversazioni a tré to name their trios. The early classical string trio generally consisted of three movements, although four, five and six movement trios were later written. Most movements were in binary form, although some of Joseph Haydn's trios were written as theme and variations. The violins shared the important thematic material, while the cello maintained an accompanimental role.

Later History 
During the mid to late 18th century, a couple of developments occurred in the genre. The changes included the absence of a figured bass, the equal treatment of all voices (as opposed to the top voice dominating the musical texture), and the use of sonata form in the first movement. These early developments paved the way for the genre to further expand into four specific types: the grand trio, the concertant trio, the brilliant trio, and the Hausmusik trio.

Grand Trio 
The grand trio was a product of South Germany and Austria. It was modeled after the mid to late 18th century serenade and nocturne. One of the best-known examples that legitimized the grand trio is Mozart’s Divertimento in E-flat, K. 563. Inspired by the piece, Beethoven set out to write String Trio in E-flat, Op. 3.

Concertant Trio 
The concertant trio was created in France, consists of two movements, and all three voices are used equally in the texture. The first movement is usually in binary or sonata form. Giuseppe Cambini was the leading composer of the genre. Some of his works include 3 trios concertants pour violon alto et violoncelle, Op. 2 and 6 trios concertants pour Deux Violons et Basse, Op. 18.

Brilliant Trio 
The brilliant trio became the most popular string trio in France in the 19th century due to its virtuosic passages featured in the first violin part. The trio consists of three movements, organized in a fast-slow-fast pattern, and the first movement is written in sonata form. The first composer to use "brilliant" in the genre was Rudolph Kreutzer in his pieces 3 Trios brillants, Op. 15 and Op. 16.

Hausmusik Trio 
The Hausmusik trio was intended for amateurs and student musicians. It was regarded as a pedagogical tool intended as preparation for the grand trio, the brilliant trio, and the string quartet. Some examples of the Hausmusik trio include 6 Trios progressives, Op. 28 by Franz Anton Hoffmeister and 3 Trios faciles et progressives, Op. 43 by Franz Alexander Pössinger.

List of string trios

Violin, viola, cello

Two violins, cello

Two violins, viola

Alternative scoring

See also
String quintet
String sextet
String octet

Notes

Sources

Further reading

External links
Dresden String Trio

Chamber music
Types of musical groups
String